KSLK (96.1 MHz) was a commercial FM radio station licensed to Visalia, California, and serving the Visalia-Tulare area. The station, owned by New Visalia Broadcasting, Inc., is currently off the air.

KSLK's license was cancelled by the FCC on October 25, 2013. In its last years on the air, KSLK broadcast a Spanish-language sports radio format, using programming from ESPN Deportes Radio.

References

External links

SLK
Defunct radio stations in the United States
Radio stations established in 1997
Radio stations disestablished in 2013
1997 establishments in California
2013 disestablishments in California
SLK
SLK